is a Japanese television jidaigeki or period drama that was broadcast in 1984. It is the 22nd in the Hissatsu series.

Cast 
 Machiko Kyō as Okuni
 Akira Onodera as Shinkichi
 Midori Nishizaki
 Gannosuke Ashiya as Kanppie
 Etsushi Takahashi as Toranosuke
 Yuriko Hishimi as Okatsu
Kiyoshi Nakajō as Yuji

References

1984 Japanese television series debuts
1980s drama television series
Jidaigeki television series